The Nilotic languages are a group of related languages spoken across a wide area between South Sudan and Tanzania by the Nilotic peoples.

Etymology 
The word Nilotic means of or relating to the Nile River or to the Nile region of Africa.

Demographics 
Nilotic peoples, who are the native speakers of the languages, originally migrated from the Gezira area in Sudan. Nilotic language speakers live in parts of the Democratic Republic of the Congo, Ethiopia, Kenya, Sudan, South Sudan, Tanzania and Uganda.

Subdivisions 
According to linguist Joseph Greenberg, the language family is divided up into three subgroups:

Eastern Nilotic languages such as Turkana and Maasai
Southern Nilotic languages such as Kalenjin and Datooga
Western Nilotic languages such as Luo, Nuer and Dinka

Before Greenberg's reclassification, Nilotic was used to refer to Western Nilotic alone, with the other two being grouped as related "Nilo-Hamitic" languages.

Blench (2012) treats the Burun languages as a fourth subgroup of Nilotic. In previous classifications, the languages were included within the Luo languages. Starostin (2015) treats the Mabaan-Burun languages as "West Nilotic" but outside the Luo level.

Reconstruction
Over 200 Proto-Nilotic lexical roots have been reconstructed by Dimmendaal (1988).
Dimmendaal reconstructs the proto Nilotic consonants as follows:

Numerals
Comparison of numerals in individual languages:

See also
Nilotic peoples
Paranilotic languages
Nilo-Saharan languages
Kir–Abbaian languages
Proto-Nilotic reconstructions (Wiktionary)

Further reading
Starostin, George. 2017. On the issue of areal-genetic entanglement in the basic lexicon: the fate of ʽmoonʼ in the Macro-Sudanic region. 12th Annual Sergei Starostin Memorial Conference on Comparative-Historical Linguistics (RSUH, March 23-24, 2017).

References

External links
Nilotic, Michael Cysouw
The Nilotic Language Family, Doris Payne

 
Language families
Southern Eastern Sudanic languages
Languages of Ethiopia
Languages of Sudan
Languages of South Sudan
Languages of the Democratic Republic of the Congo
Languages of Uganda
Languages of Kenya
Languages of Tanzania